Weyher is a surname. Notable persons with that name include:

Harry F. Weyher Jr. (1921–2002), American lawyer
Hein-Peter Weyher (born 1935), German Navy officer
Kurt Weyher (1901–1991), German admiral
Ruth Weyher (1901-1983), German actress

See also
Weyher family, a noble family
Weyher in der Pfalz, Rheinland-Pfalz, Germany